Los Super Reyes are an American musical group from Corpus Christi, Texas who play Mexican cumbia. The group was created by Cruz Martínez after he and A.B. Quintanilla had arguments over Martínez selling the group they were both in at the time, Los Kumbia Kings. A.B. Quintanilla left the group, which he had created, along with other members and created Kumbia All Starz. Cruz Martínez kept the remaining members of Los Kumbia Kings but changed the name to Los Super Reyes for legal issues.

History

2007–2008: Kumbia Kings Controversy and El Regreso de los Reyes
Many members of Kumbia All Starz, Kingz One, and Los Super Reyes were formerly together as Kumbia Kings, which had much success but unfortunately, this was bittersweet for the group amidst the controversy and love/hate relationship between the co-producers of Kumbia Kings, A.B. Quintanilla and Cruz Martínez, as well as the other members and ex-members of the group. A.B. Quintanilla, the founder of Kumbia Kings, left the group and early in the summer of 2006 formed Los Kumbia All Starz.

Cruz Martínez continued with the other half of Los Kumbia Kings until he decided to change the name of the group he now headed to Los Super Reyes. Many of the members of the Kumbia Kings opted to stay with Cruz and released their first album as Los Super Reyes in August 2007. Their first single, titled "Muévelo" has topped Latin radio airwaves in the United States as well as Latin America.

A.B. Quintanilla successfully petitioned Mexican courts to claim the naming rights to "Los Kumbia Kings", though there really was not much opposition. As fellow Kumbia Kings founder Cruz Martínez never pursued litigation to retain or share the naming rights with Quintanilla. The name "Los Kumbia Kings" is retired according to Quintanilla, though rumors persist that "Los Kumbia Kings" will resurface at a later date with new band members.

In May 2008, Cruz Martínez once again faced controversy but this time with lead singer Nando, and it led to Nando leaving the band and making his own band called Nando y Solja Kingz, and Robbie would also leave Los Super Reyes to join him. After Nando left, rumors started that Pee Wee might join the band. Cruz Martínez offered Pee Wee if he wanted to join the band, but Pee Wee said no, because he wanted to be a solo singer. Cruz Martínez then told Pee Wee that the door was always open for him if he ever wanted to join Los Super Reyes.

Los Super Reyes after their huge success on the debut album have continue to tour all Latin America and for the first time in King history will be headed to Japan in October 2008 and Spain in November 2008 due to international hit "Muévelo" which has also certified the group for platinum and gold record sales between the United States and Mexico. The group is again expected to release another very anticipated studio album early 2009.

2009–2010: Cumbia con Soul and  Kumbia Kings Reunion
It was announced by A.B. Quintanilla and Cruz Martínez themselves that the Kumbia Kings will reunite again. An exclusive interview was given on October 26, 2009 through Ventaneando America. The reunion concert was held at Palacio de los Deportes in Mexico City, Mexico on November 21, 2009. The concert started with guest singer Flex who sang songs like "Te Quiero", "Escápate", "Si No Te Tengo", "Dime Si Te Vas Con Él" and "Te Amo Tanto". Then Cruz Martínez & Los Super Reyes sang songs like "Tu Magia", "No Tengo Dinero", "Muchacha Triste", "Sabes a Chocolate", "Na Na Na (Dulce Niña)", "Preso", "Yo Seré", "Todavía", "Quédate Más (I Want You Back)", "Eres" and "Muévelo". Then A.B. Quintanilla & Kumbia All Starz sang songs like "Mami", "Reggae Kumbia", "Dijiste", "Por Ti Baby" with Flex, performed a special tribute to Michael Jackson and Selena Quintanilla, and "Parece Que Va a Llover". For the grand finale A.B. Quintanilla and Cruz Martínez and the rest of the Kumbia Kings got on stage and sang songs like "Pachuco", "Te Quiero a Ti", "Desde Que No Estás Aquí", "Fuiste Mala", "Dime Quién", "Se Fue Mi Amor", "Azúcar", "Boom Boom" and "Shhh!".

In the summer of 2010, it was stated that Joseph "Jo-Joe" Alicea López left the group. There were several interviews where Jo-Joe declared he had troubles with Cruz Martínez. Although he is not in the group, he still wants to study music and become a solo artist.
Later in his life he became a lead singer in a group as his dreams were so much pressure. His group's name was Los Chicos y Yo meaning "Me and the Boys" or "The Boys and Me" in English.

Band members
Former members
 Cruz Martínez – Keyboards, Backing Vocals, Producer (2007–2010)
 Abel Talamantez – Vocalist (2007–2010)
 Reynold Martínez – Guitar (2007–2010)
 Pangie – Vocalist (2007–2010)
 Megga – Vocalist (2007–2010)
 Menor – Vocalist (2007–2010)
 JP – Dancer, Vocalist (2007–2010)
 Juan "Pauly" Hernández – Accordion (2009–2010)
 Aldo Ramón – Bass Guitar (2009–2010)
 Ronnie “Campa” Delgado - Timbales/Percussionist (2007) Drummer (2008-2009)
 Joel Garza – Drums (2010–2010)
 Slim Ramírez – Percussion (2007)
 Nando – Lead Vocalist (2007–2008)
 Robbie Del Moral – Drums (2007–2008)
 Albert "Tiko" Akui – Percussion (2007-2008)
 Alex Ramírez – Keyboards (2007–2009)
 Papi-Joe – Vocalist (2007–2009)
 Pancho – Bass Guitar (2007–2009)
 Jo-Joe – Vocalist (2007–2010)
 BZ Now known as "Mannie B" – Dancer/Singer (2008–2009)
 Nino B – Dancer, Vocalist (2007–2010)

Discography

Studio albums

Singles

Other songs

References

External links
 Official website

 
Musical groups established in 2007
Cruz Martínez
Cumbia musical groups
Kumbia Kings
Mexican musical groups
Musical groups from Texas
Warner Music Latina artists